The Treaty of Hanover was a treaty of defensive alliance signed on 3 September 1725 by the Kingdom of Great Britain, the Electorate of Hanover, the Kingdom of France, and the Kingdom of Prussia. The alliance was formed to combat the power of the Austro-Spanish alliance founded at the Peace of Vienna months earlier in May 1725.

The United Provinces and the Kingdom of Sweden later acceded to the Hanoverian Alliance through the Treaties of The Hague (1726) and Stockholm (1727). The Kingdom of Denmark-Norway did not formally join the Hanoverian Alliance, but did sign the Treaty of Copenhagen with Great Britain and France in April 1727. In 1728, Prussia would ally itself with Emperor Charles VI and the Viennese Alliance by signing the secret Treaty of Berlin.

Principal Conditions

Alliance Provisions

Reasoning and Formation of the Hanoverian Alliance 
The Spanish, who was an ally and close friend of the Habsburg monarchy following the succession of Charles I (V) to the Spanish throne in 1516, broke their partnership with the Austrians in 1700. This was due to the death of Charles II, the last Habsburg Monarch of Spain, who died without issue. King Charles II appointed Philip de Bourbon, Duke of Anjou as his successor. The following succession crisis sparked the War of the Spanish Succession (1700-1714), and consequently ended the two century alliance between Spain.

After the defeat of the Spanish in the War of the Quadruple Alliance (1717-1720), the Austrians decided to ally the Spanish once again in order to reset the balance of power in Europe; which had leaned towards France in recent years. King George I had also become wary of a renewed hegemony of Europe by Spain and the Empire. The Treaty of Hanover marks the beginning of the Hanoverian Alliance as a formal opposition to the renewed Austro-Spanish alliance (which would later be joined by the Russian Empire, and the Electorates of Bavaria and Cologne in 1726). Separate reassurances of full military support were also given in the event of the Holy Roman Empire attacking the French unexpectedly.  "There shall be now, and in all Time coming, a true, firm, and inviolable Peace, the most sincere and intimate Friendship, and the most strict Alliance and Union between the said three most serene Kings, their Heirs and Successors...and prevent and repel all Wrongs and Damages, by the most proper means they can find out."

Military and Naval Support 
It was agreed among the signers that approximate amounts of troops and cavalry would be supplied immediately in support if an enemy were to declare war. Great Britain and France would both send eight thousand troops and four thousand cavalry, while Prussia would send only three thousand troops and two thousand cavalry. Naval support was also guaranteed if needed.

Separate Article

City of Thorn 
In 1714, a religious massacre occurred in Royal Prussia called the Tumult of Thorn Religious tensions had been present in the city since the Jesuits entered into Thorn due to Poland-Lithuania's acceptance of the Counter-Reformation in 1595. After the Treaty of Oliva in 1660, religious tolerance was enforced in Royal Prussia; the city had become about half Catholic and half Lutheran.

On 16 and 17 March 1726, the Jesuits were celebrating the feast day of Corpus Christi when Jesuit student of a monastery complained that Lutherans who were watching the procession did not take off their hats or kneel before the statue of Mary. Fights on both sides ensued, and a Jesuit monastery was damaged.

Jesuits were badly beaten, portraits of Catholic saints were destroyed, and part of the altar was damaged. The Lutherans also gathered a pile of Catholic books and paintings, which were set on fire outside the monastery. After these events, the Jesuits sued the City in the Polish Supreme Court in Warsaw. The court, directed by King Augustus II, issued a verdict where thirteen Lutherans were set to be executed.

Great Britain and Prussia, who both guaranteed the Treaty of Oliva, were greatly concerned with this massacre. The Polish court's verdict revealed religious intolerance present in Poland towards its Lutheran population, which both powers believed needed to be corrected and damaged Poland's international reputation. Prussia and Great Britain agreed to concert efforts towards Poland to enforce tolerance in the area.

Footnotes

References 

1725 in Denmark
Legal history of the Netherlands
18th century in Spain
1725 in Sweden
Hanover
1725 treaties
Hanover
Hanover
1725 in Great Britain
1725 in France
1725 in Prussia
1725 in Spain